Knema attenuata is a species of plant in the family Myristicaceae. It is endemic to India.

References

External links
 

Flora of India (region)
attenuata
Least concern plants
Taxonomy articles created by Polbot